Le Roc-Saint-André is a former commune in the Morbihan department of Brittany in north-western France. On 1 January 2016, it was merged into the new commune Val d'Oust. Inhabitants of Le Roc-Saint-André are called in French Roxédois.

See also
Communes of the Morbihan department

References

External links

Official website 

Former communes of Morbihan